Qasemabad-e Yolmeh Salian (also Romanized as Qāsemābād-e Yolmeh Sālīān) is a village in Mazraeh-ye Shomali Rural District, Voshmgir District, Aqqala County, Golestan Province, Iran. At the 2006 census, its population was 425, in 94 families.

References 

Populated places in Aqqala County